"I Just Fall in Love Again" is a song written by Larry Herbstritt, with co-writers Steve Dorff, Harry Lloyd, and Gloria Sklerov. Herbstritt had composed the melody and chords for the chorus and a chord progression for the verse, which he took to his friend Steve Dorff. Harry Lloyd and Gloria Sklerov completed the lyrics. The song was originally recorded by the Carpenters and later covered by Dusty Springfield, and Anne Murray, who was unaware Springfield had recorded it just 6 months prior.

The Carpenters' version
The Carpenters' version was included on the duo's 1977 album Passage. On the Carpenters' official website, Richard Carpenter notes that he felt the song was perfect for his sister Karen's voice and felt their version had hit-single potential. However, A&M Records decided not to release it because it was considered too long for Top 40 radio stations to play at the time (just over 4 minutes) and could not be abridged.

In 2004, Richard Carpenter added a remixed "I Just Fall in Love Again" to the Carpenters' 2-disc compilation, Gold: 35th Anniversary Edition.

Personnel
Karen Carpenterlead vocals
Richard Carpenter keyboards
Joe Osbornbass guitar
Tony Pelusoelectric guitar
Ron Tuttdrums
Earle Dumleroboe
Gregg Smith Singersbacking vocals

Dusty Springfield's version
Recorded in summer 1978 and released in early 1979 on Springfield's Living Without Your Love album the same week her record label, United Artists Records, was sold, the track was subsequently never released as a single and went largely unnoticed by the listening public due to the success of Anne Murray's recording of the song, released not long after.

Anne Murray's version

Canadian country singer Anne Murray was unaware Dusty Springfield had recorded "I Just Fall in Love Again" just 6 months prior. Springfield was one of Murray's favourite singers, and has said "If I had known (Springfield) had released it as a single, I never would have recorded it" as Murray's version of the song largely overshadowed Springfield's. She released it in early 1979, on her platinum-selling album New Kind of Feeling.

Murray released her version as a single, and it topped Billboard's Country and Adult Contemporary charts for three weeks, while reaching number 11 on the Cash Box Top 100 and  number 12 on the Billboard Hot 100 chart.

It was the first of three successive number one Country hits and four consecutive number one Adult Contemporary hits during 1979 and 1980. Though Murray loves the song, she is quoted in The Billboard Book of Number One Adult Contemporary Hits as saying she was surprised at its success on the Country charts, as she didn't feel the song sounded very "country". Nevertheless, Billboard ranked it as the number one Country hit of 1979. Murray included the song as a posthumous duet with Dusty Springfield on her own 2007 album Duets: Friends & Legends.

Personnel
Anne Murrayvocals
Pat Riccio Jr., Brian Gattokeyboards
Jorn Andersondrums
Peter Cardinalibass
Aidan Mason, Brian Russell, Bob Mannguitars
Bob Luciersteel guitar
Rick Wilkins & Peter Cardinalistring arrangement

Chart performance

Weekly charts

Year-end charts

References

External links
 
 

1977 singles
1977 songs
1979 singles
Songs written by Steve Dorff
The Carpenters songs
Anne Murray songs
Dusty Springfield songs
Song recordings produced by Jim Ed Norman
Billboard Hot Country Songs number-one singles of the year
A&M Records singles
Capitol Records singles
Juno Award for Single of the Year singles
Pop ballads